Bradenton Area Convention Center, formerly Manatee Civic Center, is a 4,000-seat multi-purpose arena and convention center in Palmetto, Florida.  It was home to the Florida Stingers of the Continental Basketball Association and Florida Scorpions of the American Professional Football League. It also hosted UWF's first and only live pay-per-view event, Beach Brawl, on June 9, 1991.

References

External links
Venue information

Music venues in Florida
Sports venues in Florida
Convention centers in Florida
Concert halls in Florida
Sports venues in Manatee County, Florida
Tourist attractions in Manatee County, Florida
Basketball venues in Florida
1985 establishments in Florida
Sports venues completed in 1985
Event venues established in 1985
Continental Basketball Association venues